Netball at the 1979 South Pacific Games in Suva Fiji was held from 28 August to 8 September 1979.

This was the fourth competition at the South Pacific Games for netball after missing the 1971 South Pacific Games and 1975 South Pacific Games. The winner of the event were the Fiji over the Cook Islands. Papua New Guinea took home the bronze.

Final standings

See also
 Netball at the Pacific Games

References

 Mamia Tunui Savage. Cook Islands Sports and National Olympic Committee webpage

1979 Pacific Games
South Pacific Games
Netball at the Pacific Games
South Pacific